The Kleiner Kulm is a mountain in Bavaria, Germany. The mountain has a height of 626 m and thereby is the highest point of the Franconian Switzerland. On top, there is a lookout tower of 11 metres, which gives a view over the surrounding landscape.

External links 

 Kleiner Kulm on naturerlebnis-fs.de 

Mountains of Bavaria
Mountains and hills of the Franconian Jura